Phyllonotus eversoni is a species of sea snail, a marine gastropod mollusk in the family Muricidae, the murex snails or rock snails.

Description
The size of an adult shell varies between 100 mm and 155 mm.

Distribution
This species can be found along Cocos Island, Costa Rica.

References

 Merle D., Garrigues B. & Pointier J.-P. (2011) Fossil and Recent Muricidae of the world. Part Muricinae. Hackenheim: Conchbooks. 648 pp. page(s): 116

External links
 

Muricidae
Gastropods described in 1987